Chris Henry (born 1962) is a museum professional who is currently (2017) Director of Heritage at Surgeons' Hall Museums at the Royal College of Surgeons of Edinburgh.

Early life and education
He was born in Gainsborough, Lincolnshire, England and attended Queen Elizabeth’s Grammar School, Gainsborough.  He subsequently attended Middlesex University graduating BA (Hons) in History (1993), Kings College, London graduating MA in War Studies (1994) and University College, London, graduating MA in Museum Studies (1999).

Career 
Henry’s career path followed an initial interest in military museology as  Curator of Artillery, Royal Armouries Tower of London and Royal Armouries Fort Nelson (1994–99), Head of Collections, Museum of the Royal Regiment of Artillery (2000-2003), then Head of Collections, Museum of Naval Firepower, Gosport Hampshire (2003-2005) where he supervised delivery of Firepower Royal Artillery Museum in Woolwich in 2005 . 
Moving to Scotland he was Director, Museum of Scottish Lighthouses, Fraserburgh before becoming Head of Collections, Dundee Industrial Heritage, covering RRS Discovery and Verdant Works. He was appointed Director of Heritage, Surgeons Hall Museum. Royal College of Surgeons of Edinburgh in 2010.
Here he organised financing and delivery of the £4.5 million Lister Project which transformed the Museum layout and displays.
This project was nominated for six different architectural and heritage awards and was Highly Commended in the RICS Awards for 2016.

Exhibitions 
Henry has curated and delivered over thirty exhibitions in his career, from smaller temporary exhibitions to the completion of the upgrading of the Surgeons’ Hall Museums complex.

Publications 
His books and  articles  on museums and military subjects include:

Museums within a museum, in Medical Museums, Past Present and Future, Alberti S Ed.,(2013) London, Royal College of Surgeons. 

Shield of Empire (1998), Leeds, Trustees of the Royal Armories. 

British Napoleonic Artillery 1793-1815: Field Artillery v. 1 (New Vanguard) by Chris Henry and Brian Delf (16 Oct 2002) Oxford,  Osprey Publishing. 

British Napoleonic Artillery 1793-1815: Siege and Coastal Artillery v. 2  by Chris Henry and Brian Delf (2003) Oxford, New Vanguard. 

Depth Charge: Royal Naval Mines, Depth Charges and Underwater Weapons 1914-1945,  (2005)  Barnsley, Pen and Sword. 

English Civil War Artillery 1642-51 (2005), Oxford, New Vanguard. 
	
British Anti-tank Artillery 1939-45 (2004), Oxford, New Vanguard. 

The 25-pounder Field Gun 1939-72 (2002), Oxford, New Vanguard.  

The Ebro 1938: Death knell of the Republic– (1999), Oxford, Campaign. 

Napoleonic Naval Armaments 1792-1815 (2004), Oxford, New Vanguard.  

Battle of the Coral Sea (Great Naval Battles) (2003), Washington, US Naval Institute Press.

Personal life 
Chris Henry lives in Fife in Scotland with his wife Jane and daughter Charlotte.

References 

1962 births
People from Gainsborough, Lincolnshire
Scottish curators
Living people